Afton is a former rural municipality in the Canadian province of Prince Edward Island within Queens County.

History 
The Municipality of Afton was originally incorporated in 1974. It incorporated as a rural municipality on January 1, 2018. On September 1, 2020, the Rural Municipality of Afton amalgamated with the rural municipalities of Bonshaw, Meadowbank, New Haven-Riverdale, and West River. The amalgamated municipality was named the Rural Municipality of West River.

Geography 
Localities within Afton include Cumberland, Fairview, New Dominion, Nine Mile Creek, Rice Point, and Rocky Point.

References 

Communities in Queens County, Prince Edward Island
Former rural municipalities in Prince Edward Island